The Big 12 Network (stylized as the Big XII Network) was a syndicated package featuring live broadcasts of College basketball events from the Big 12 Conference that was broadcast under that branding from 2008 until 2014. It was owned and operated by ESPN Plus, the syndication arm of ESPN, Inc., and was mainly shown in areas in the Big 12’s geographical footprint, along with other areas of the United States. Games were shown locally on broadcast stations, regional sports networks, as well as on ESPN Full Court, and WatchESPN.

History

The Creative Sports/OCC merger and the ESPN Plus years
Beginning in 1996 after ESPN’s consolidation of Creative Sports (which ESPN owned since 1994 ) and OCC Sports (acquired from Ohlmeyer Communication Company), ESPN Plus (also known as ESPN Regional Television) assumed syndication rights to Big 12 Conference men’s basketball games after the Big 8 Conference and the Southwest Conference merged to create the Big 12. Raycom Sports previously had syndication rights to basketball and football games of both those conferences from the 1980s until that syndicator lost the Big 8 in 1993–94, and the Southwest Conference merged with the Big 8 to become the Big 12 Conference in 1996.

The new branding
Starting with the 2008–2009 season, all Big 12 Conference basketball game broadcasts from ESPN Plus began to be broadcast under the Big 12 Network branding.

Demise
After the first 18 years of the conference’s existence, the Big 12 Network ceased operations in 2014 as all rights to Big 12 Basketball moved to the ESPN family of networks (e.g. ESPN, ESPN2, ESPNU and ESPNews).
 Several Big 12 basketball games also moved to the Texas Longhorns-oriented Longhorn Network, which is a joint venture between ESPN and the University of Texas at Austin that launched in August 2011. 
However, CBS Sports does choose to broadcast at least two to three Big 12 games under their NCAA on CBS branding.

On-air personalities

College basketball 
Dave Armstrong – play-by-play commentator (2010–2013) 
Reid Gettys – color commentator (2010–2013)
Mitch Holthus – play-by-play commentator (2010–2013)
Bryndon Manzer – Big 12 Conference color commentator (2010–2013)
Chris Piper – Big 12 Conference sideline reporter (2012–2013)
Brad Sham – Big 12 Conference play-by-play (2010–2013)
Jon Sundvold – Big 12 Conference color commentator (2010–2012)
Rich Zvosec – Big 12 Conference sideline reporter (2012–2013)

Availability
The Big 12 Network was available mainly in areas of the central United States, including much of Texas, Oklahoma, Kansas, eastern Nebraska, Iowa, Missouri, and western Arkansas. Other areas served by the Big 12 Network included parts of West Virginia, north-central and east-central Kentucky, Illinois, Indiana, Ohio, and southern Pennsylvania, especially during the 2012–2013 and 2013–2014 season. This was true because in 2012, Texas Christian University joined the Big 12 from the Mountain West Conference, and West Virginia University joined the Big 12 from the original Big East Conference. In spite of the University of Missouri (along with Texas A&M University) leaving the Big 12 to join the basketball-powerful Southeastern Conference in 2012, some stations in Missouri, especially in the Kansas City, Columbia, St. Louis, and Joplin markets, either kept the local rights to the Big 12 Network or lost them to another station in their home market.

In addition to the listed areas above, three independent stations in California also carried the syndication package. Throughout the 2008–2014 branding period, some Big 12 Network stations also broadcast football games from sister syndicator SEC TV, which provided Southeastern Conference football games to certain stations, most notably including KTXA/Dallas, Texas and KDOC-TV/Los Angeles, California, although KDOC also broadcast SEC TV basketball games on a limited schedule. This was especially true to some former Big 12 Network partners that switched to or altered to and from SEC TV broadcasts.

Broadcast affiliates
The following over-the-air broadcast stations broadcast the Big 12 Network:

Arkansas

California

Idaho

Illinois

Indiana

Iowa

Kansas

Kentucky

Michigan

Mississippi

Missouri

Nebraska

Ohio

Oklahoma

Pennsylvania

Puerto Rico

Texas

West Virginia

Wisconsin

Wyoming

Online platforms and Regional sports networks

See also
ESPN Events – previously known as ESPN Plus, and ESPN Regional Television (ERT)  
SEC TV – the ESPN Plus-operated syndication service of Southeastern Conference basketball and football 
SEC Network – the cable-exclusive SEC-dedicated network that launched in 2014 
Raycom Sports – the previous syndicator of Big 8, SWC, and SEC sporting events 
ACC Network  – Raycom Sports’ syndicated programming service that provides Atlantic Coast Conference basketball and football events  
American Sports Network – new syndicated programming service of Sinclair Broadcasting Group with syndication rights to Conference USA

References

External links
Big 12 Conference 
ESPN 
Longhorn Network

 
 
 

 

College sports television syndicators
ESPN media outlets
Defunct television networks in the United States
Simulcasts
Sports television networks in the United States
Television channels and stations established in 2008
Television channels and stations disestablished in 2014
Television syndication packages